Blaise MacDonald is an American college ice hockey coach currently heading the men's team at Colby College.

Career
Previously he was an assistant coach at Dartmouth (1986–87), Princeton (1987–88), UMass Lowell (1988–90) and Boston University (1991–96), and a head coach at Niagara (1996–2001), where he compiled an all-time record of 91–58–17 and UMass Lowell (2001–11) with an overall record of 150–178–44.

Head coaching record

References

External links
 Colby profile
 

Year of birth missing (living people)
Living people
American ice hockey coaches
Boston University Terriers men's ice hockey coaches
Colby Mules men's ice hockey coaches
Dartmouth Big Green men's ice hockey coaches
Niagara Purple Eagles men's ice hockey coaches
Princeton Tigers men's ice hockey coaches
RIT Tigers men's ice hockey players
UMass Lowell River Hawks men's ice hockey coaches
American men's ice hockey defensemen